Samoa competed at the Commonwealth Games in Manchester. It sent 34 male and three female competitors. Athletics, Boxing, Lawn Bowls, Rugby Sevens, Shooting, Weightlifting and Wrestling  It won two silvers and a bronze, all in weightlifting, the nations best performance at the games.

Medals

Medalists

Silver
Weightlifting:
 Ofisa Ofisa, Men's 85kg Clean and Jerk.

Bronze
Weightlifting:
 Ofisa Ofisa, Men's 85kg Combined.
 Niusila Opeloge Men's 85kg Snatch

See also
2002 Commonwealth Games results

References

2002
2002 in Samoan sport
Nations at the 2002 Commonwealth Games